William Frederick Cockburn (28 November 1916 – 16 July 2004) was an Australian cricketer. He played one first-class cricket match for Victoria in 1945.

See also
 List of Victoria first-class cricketers

References

External links
 

1916 births
2004 deaths
Australian cricketers
Victoria cricketers
Cricketers from Melbourne
Australian Army personnel of World War II
Australian Army soldiers